The Canada men's national water polo team represents Canada in international men's water polo competitions and friendly matches. The team is overseen by Water Polo Canada, a member of the Fédération Internationale de Natation (FINA). The team qualified for the 2008 Summer Olympics in Beijing, PR China by finishing fourth at 2008 Olympic Qualifying Tournament in Romania.

Results

Olympic Games

 1972 – 16th place
 1976 – 9th place
 1984 – 10th place
 2008 – 11th place

World Championship

 1975 – 14th place
 1978 – 14th place
 1982 – 14th place
 1986 – 13th place
 1991 – 13th place
 1994 – 14th place
 1998 – 13th place
 2001 – 15th place
 2003 – 14th place
 2005 – 13th place
 2007 – 12th place
 2009 – 8th place
 2011 – 10th place
 2013 – 11th place
 2015 – 9th place
 2017 – 15th place
 2022 – Withdrew

FINA World League

 2005 – Semifinal round
 2006 – 9th place
 2007 – 7th place
 2008 – 6th place
 2011 – 7th place
 2012 – Intercontinental Preliminary round
 2013 – Intercontinental Preliminary round
 2014 – 6th place
 2015 – Intercontinental Preliminary round
 2018 – Intercontinental Preliminary round
 2019 – 8th place
 2022 – 8th place

Pan American Games

 1963 – 4th place
 1967 – 5th place
 1971 – 5th place
 1975 – 4th place
 1979 –  Bronze medal
 1983 –  Bronze medal
 1987 – 4th place
 1991 – 4th place
 1995 – 5th place
 1999 –  Bronze medal
 2003 –  Bronze medal
 2007 –  Bronze medal
 2011 –  Silver medal
 2015 –  Bronze medal
 2019 –  Silver medal

ASUA Cup (UANA Cup)

 2011 –  Gold medal
 2013a –  Gold medal
 2013b –  Silver medal
 2015 –  Gold medal
 2017 –  Silver medal
 2019 –  Bronze medal

Commonwealth Championship

 2002 –  Gold medal
 2006 –  Silver medal

Team

Current squad
Squad for the 2017 World Aquatics Championships.

Head coach:  Giuseppe Porzio

Past squads
 1972 Olympic Games – 16th place
 Clifford Barry, Gabor Csepregi, Jack Gauldie, David Hart, Stephen Hart, Guy Leclerc, Donald Packer, William van der Pol, Patrick Pugliese, Allan Pyle and Robert Thompson.
 1976 Olympic Games – 9th place
Clifford Barry, Gábor Csepregi, Dominique Dion, Jim Ducharme, George Gross, David Hart, Guy Leclerc, John MacLeod, Paul Pottier, Patrick Pugliese, and Gaétan Turcotte, Head Coach - Desző Lemhényi, Manager & Assistant Coach - Iván Somlai
 1984 Olympic Games – 10th place
 John Anderson, Rene Bol, Geoff Brown, Brian Collyer, Simon Deschamps, Dominique Dion, George Gross, Sylvain Huet, Alexander Juhasz, Bill Meyer, Paul Pottier, Gordon Vantol, and Rick Zayonc. Coaching Staff: Head Coach Gabor Csepregi; Assistant Coaches Robert Thompson and David Hart; Manager John MacMaster.
 1999 Pan American Games -  Bronze Medal
Ted Bader, Mark Block, Darryl Bourne (captain), Zoltan Csepregi, Adam Deffett, Kent Hardisty, Garrett Head, Yannick Lize, Chris Lovett, Nathaniel Miller, Mikael Sabo, Adam Sidky, Alex Thibeault. Head Coach: John Csikos.
 2003 World Championship – 14th place
David Allan, Vladimir Ćosić, Adam Defett, Aaron Feltham, Michael Gordon, Garrett Head, Iain Lark, Dušan Lazarević, Thomas Marks, Nathaniel Miller, Noah Miller, Kevin Mitchell, and Andrey Shevstov. Head Coach: John Csikos.
 2003 Pan American Games –  Bronze Medal
Vladimir Ćosić, Adam Defett, Michael Gordon, Kent Hardisty, Garrett Head, Iain Lark, Dušan Lazarević, Thomas Marks, Nathaniel Miller, Noah Miller, Kevin Mitchell, Mikael Sabo, and Nic Youngblud. Head Coach: John Csikos.
 2005 World Championship – 13th place
Aaron Feltham, Kevin Graham, Clem Hui, Brandon Jung, Iain Lark, Thomas Marks, Nathaniel Miller, Noah Miller, Kevin Mitchell, Jean Sayegh, Daniel Stein, Alexandre Thibeault, and Nic Youngblud. Head Coach: Dragan Jovanović.
 2007 FINA World League – 7th place
Brandon Jung, Aaron Feltham, Kevin Graham, Con Kudaba, Thomas Marks, Nathaniel Miller, Noah Miller, Kevin Mitchell, Jean Sayegh, Robin Randall, Andrew Robinson, Daniel Stein, and Nic Youngblud. Head Coach: Dragan Jovanović.
 2007 Pan American Games –  Bronze Medal
Robin Randall, Con Kudaba, Andrew Robinson, Kevin Mitchell, Kevin Graham, Thomas Marks (captain), Brandon Jung, Daniel Stein, Aaron Feltham, Noah Miller, Jean Sayegh, Nathaniel Miller, and Nic Youngblud. Head Coach: Dragan Jovanović.
 2008 Olympic Qualifying Tournament – 4th place
Robin Randall, Con Kudaba, Devon Diggle, Kevin Mitchell, Justin Boyd, Thomas Marks, Brandon Jung, Kevin Graham, Aaron Feltham, Sasa Palamarevic, Jean Sayegh, Nathaniel Miller, and Nic Youngblud. Head Coach: Dragan Jovanović.
 2008 Olympic Games – 11th place
Justin Boyd, Devon Diggle, Aaron Feltham, Kevin Graham, Brandon Jung, Con Kudaba, Thomas Marks, Nathaniel Miller, Kevin Mitchell, Sasa Palamarevic, Robin Randall, Jean Sayegh, and Nic Youngblud. Head Coach: Dragan Jovanović.

See also

 Canada men's Olympic water polo team records and statistics
 Canada women's national water polo team

References

External links
Waterpolo Canada

Men's national water polo teams